Rose is a 2014 Kannada romantic drama film starring Ajay Rao and Shravya. The film is directed by Sahana Murthy and produced by Tharun Shivappa. The music for the film is composed by Anoop Seelin. The film is set for a simultaneous release in India and Australia on 4 July 2014.

The film was launched in May 2013 and is an intense emotional love story involving the Rose flower as a central character. The filming took place around Bangalore, Mysore and went abroad to shoot three songs. The film is expected to be remade in Tamil, Telugu and Hindi languages with the distributor already sold the film to a leading Bollywood production house for  75Lacs.

Cast
Ajay Rao as Ajai
Shravya as Amrutha
Sadhu Kokila
Bullet Prakash
Mico Nagraj
Sudha Belawadi
Pavitra Lokesh
Aruna Balraj
Saikumar Pudipeddi as Jailer
Petrol Prasanna 
Shankar Ashwath 
Muni 
Patre Nagaraj 
Edakallu Chandrashekhar 
Girija Lokesh 
Malathi Mysore 
Harish Rayappa 
Cockroach Sudheer 
Rockline Sudhakar

Soundtrack
The audio of the film was launched in January 2014 in Bangalore. The event was attended by the cast and crew of the film. Anoop Seelin has composed five tracks for the film.

Reception
A critic from The Times of India wrote that "While the first half of the film doesn't have much to offer, it gains momentum in the second part, keeping the audience hooked".

References

External links

A Rose for Shravya 
Star-studded mahurat for Rose

2010s Kannada-language films
Indian romantic drama films
2014 romantic drama films
Films scored by Anoop Seelin